A catchment area may refer to:
 Catchment area (human geography), the area and population from which a facility or region attracts visitors or customers
 Drainage basin, an extent of land where water from precipitation drains into a body of water